Wasagu/Danko is a Local Government Area in Kebbi State, Nigeria. Its headquarters is in the town of Ribah.

It has an area of 4,016 km and a population of 265,203 at the 2006 census.

The postal code of the area is 872.

References

Local Government Areas in Kebbi State